Dryobalanops fusca is a species of plant in the family Dipterocarpaceae. The species name fusca is derived from Latin (fuscus = dark-coloured) and refers to the dark coloured indumentum This species is endemic to Borneo, where it is threatened due to habitat loss. It is a large emergent tree, up to 60 m tall, found in kerangas forests on raised beaches. It is a heavy hardwood sold under the trade names of  Kapur.

References

fusca
Endemic flora of Borneo
Trees of Borneo
Critically endangered flora of Asia
Flora of the Sundaland heath forests